Smoktunowicz is a Polish surname. Notable people with this name include:
Agata Smoktunowicz (born 1973), Polish mathematician
Hanna Smoktunowicz (born 1970), Polish television journalist
Robert Smoktunowicz (born 1962), Polish politician

Polish-language surnames